Emam (also Romanized as Emām; also known as Omām and Umām) is a village in Somam Rural District, Rankuh District, Amlash County, Gilan Province, Iran. At the 2006 census, its population was 122, in 51 families.

References 

Populated places in Amlash County